Jeroen Smits (born 21 June 1972) is a former Dutch cricketer and a former captain. He is a right-handed batsman who usually occupies the position of wicketkeeper.

For many years, since his debut in cricket's ICC Trophy on 20 February 1994, Smits has been backup keeper to Reinout Scholte and called upon when and where necessary. Since 2002, he has involved himself in Dutch league games. He captained his country in a game against Scotland in the 2007 World Cup, and in the 2009 ICC World Twenty20 captained his side to a win over hosts England, to date their most significant cricketing victory by some margin.

In October 2009, he announced his retirement from international cricket. In April 2018, he was appointed the team manager of the national team.

References

External links
 

1972 births
Living people
Dutch cricket captains
Netherlands One Day International cricketers
Cricketers at the 2003 Cricket World Cup
Cricketers at the 2007 Cricket World Cup
Netherlands Twenty20 International cricketers
Sportspeople from The Hague
Wicket-keepers
Dutch cricketers